Israel Bonds, the commonly-known name of Development Corporation for Israel (DCI), is the U.S. underwriter of debt securities issued by the State of Israel. DCI is headquartered in New York City, and is a broker-dealer and member of the Financial Industry Regulatory Authority (FINRA). Dani Naveh is president and CEO.

Bonds are sold in Canada through Canada-Israel Securities, Ltd.; Europe through Development Company for Israel GmbH; and Development Company for Israel, Ltd. in the UK. Sales have increased steadily since the initial Independence Issue was offered in 1951, with total worldwide sales now exceeding $48 billion.

At first, investors in Israel bonds were largely members of the American Jewish community looking to support the fledgling state's economy. However, throughout subsequent years, private and institutional investors alike viewed Israel bonds as a meaningful investments. Over 90 U.S. state and municipal pension and treasury funds have invested more than $3 billion in Israel bonds to date. Other investors in Israel bonds include corporations, insurance companies, associations, unions, banks, financial institutions, universities, foundations and synagogues. Israel uses proceeds from the sale of the bonds for general purposes of the state.

Origins
The idea to float bonds issued by Israel's government was conceived by Israel's first prime minister, David Ben-Gurion, in the aftermath of Israel’s War of Independence, when the nation was critically short of economic resources.

Ben-Gurion turned to Diaspora Jewry, with the goal of obtaining millions of dollars in funding by engaging them as active partners in building the new Jewish state. In September 1950, he convened a meeting of American Jewish leaders at Jerusalem's King David Hotel, where Ben-Gurion shared his vision for a bond issue, which the delegates supported. The Knesset voted to launch Israel’s first bond issue in February 1951. In May, the prime minister traveled to New York City to help launch the inaugural Independence Issue at a Madison Square Garden ceremony, raising $35 million. Expectations for first-year sales were $25 million. Instead, final results for 1951 more than doubled projections, exceeding $52 million.

Achievements
By 1957, "bond sales alone amount(ed) to an astonishing 35% of Israel's special development budget", with Foreign Minister Golda Meir emphatically stating, "the central role in building our economic strength has been played by Israel bonds." 

Over subsequent decades, sales continued to increase, particularly in times of crisis. During 1967's Six-Day War, sales exceeded $250 million, and in 1973, the year of the Yom Kippur War, sales exceeded $500 million. In 1991, the year of the Gulf War and Iraqi missile strikes on Israel, sales exceeded $1 billion.

In 2020,in response to the COVID-19 pandemic, Israel Bonds approached the Finance Ministry to increase its goal for the year. The Finance Ministry approved the initiative, and the year concluded with record U.S. sales exceeding $1.5 billion. 
 
Total worldwide sales of Israel bonds since the first bonds were issued in 1951 exceeded $48 billion in October 2022.

Securities
Initially, Israel Bonds offered a single investment option. As the program became more successful, multiple types of Israel bonds with varying maturities and purchase minumums were made available. The following bonds are/were offered in 2022:
 Jubilee Bonds – fixed rate 2, 3, 5,10 and 15-year bonds; $25,000 minimum investment.
 Maccabee Bonds – fixed rate 2, 3,5, 10 and 15-year bonds; $5,000 minimum investment.
 Sabra Bonds – fixed rate 3-year bonds; $1,000 minimum investment Interest is paid upon maturity.
 Mazel Tov Bonds – fixed rate 5-year bonds; $100 minimum investment Interest paid upon maturity.
 eMazel Tov Bonds – fixed rate 5-year bonds; $36 minimum investment interest paid at maturity. Available only online.
 Shalom Bonds - fixed rate 1 and 2-year bonds, $36 minimum investment; Interest paid at maturity. May only be held by a religious, charitable, literary, scientific or educational organization, contributions to which are, at the time of transfer, deductible for income and similar tax purposes. Available only online.
 Jubilee Fixed Rate Financing Bonds – 2-year bonds; minimum subscription of $100,000; must be financed through an Authorized Lender.

Although Israel has never defaulted in the payment of principal or interest on any of its internal or external debt, prospective purchasers are warned of sovereign credit risk.

References

External links
 

Securities (finance)
Government of Israel
Finance in Israel
Government bonds issued by Israel